Kim Jun-myeon (born May 22, 1991), better known by his stage name Suho (meaning "guardian"), is a South Korean singer, songwriter, and actor. He is the leader of the South Korean-Chinese boy group Exo and its sub-unit Exo-K. He debuted as a soloist on March 30, 2020 with the release of his EP, Self-Portrait. Outside of his musical career, Suho has also starred in various television dramas and movies such as One Way Trip (2016), The Universe's Star (2017), Rich Man (2018), Middle School Girl A (2018), and How Are U Bread (2020).

Early life
Suho is a native of Seoul and lives in the Seoul area of Apgujeong with his family. During his youth, Suho was the class president in elementary school and the vice-chairman of his school's student body. He graduated from the prestigious Whimoon High School, where he excelled academically.

Suho became a trainee through SM Entertainment's Casting System in 2006 when he was 16 years old, after being discovered on the streets by an SM casting manager. In 2007, he was cast with a cameo role in the Super Junior film Attack on the Pin-Up Boys.

Career

2012–2019: Debut and acting career beginnings

Suho was introduced as the tenth member of Exo on February 15, 2012. The group debuted in April 2012 with the extended play Mama with him as their leader. In 2013, Suho voiced the main character Bernard for the Korean dub of the animated movie, Saving Santa. He also recorded the movie's original soundtrack of the same name with Apink's Jung Eun-ji. In February 2014, Suho became a regular host for SBS' weekly music show Inkigayo alongside fellow Exo member Baekhyun, ZE:A member Kwanghee and actress Lee Yu-bi. Suho and Baekhyun left their positions in November 2014 in order to focus on the release of Exo's second studio album.

In January 2015, he starred in SM Entertainment's hologram musical, School OZ, playing the character of Hans alongside labelmates Changmin, Key, Luna, Xiumin and Seulgi. In April 2015, he was a regular cast member in the KBS variety show Fluttering India, where they explored few places in Mumbai, India.

In March 2016, Suho made his big screen debut the indie film  One Way Trip, which premiered at the 20th Busan International Film Festival. In April 2016, he was confirmed to be starring in the upcoming web drama How Are U Bread. The series is scheduled to be released in Korea and China. In July 2016, Suho and fellow Exo member Chen released a duet titled "Beautiful Accident" as an original soundtrack for the Chinese movie of the same name. Suho starred as the male lead in the MBC drama special The Universe's Star, part of the drama trilogy Three Color Fantasy in January 2017 and recorded an original soundtrack titled "Starlight" for the drama. In February 2017, he collaborated with jazz pianist Song Young-joo on "Curtain", the last single from the Station project's first season. In September 2017, it was confirmed that Suho will be the male lead of the film Female Middle Schooler A. From December 2017 to March 2018, starred as Crown Prince Rudolf in musical The Last Kiss.

In March 2018, Suho collaborated with Jang Jae-in and released two duets titled "Dinner" and "Do you have a moment". In May 2018, Suho returned to the small screen with the South Korean adaption of the 2012 Japanese drama Rich Man, Poor Woman, playing the role of an IT company founder (portrayed by Shun Oguri in the original). Suho also starred in "Student A", a film adaptation of a webtoon, released in June 2018. From July to August 2018, Suho starred in the musical The Man Who Laughs in the role of Gwynplaine, a pure character with a monster-like face. He received standing ovation and positive feedback for his role from the audience on the musical's first day. On October 28, 2019, a VR Film titled "The Present" is released in which Suho played the role of a young entrepreneur Ha-Neul, along with actors like Shin Ha-Kyun and Kim Seul-gi.

2020–present: Solo debut, military service, and further releases
On March 30, 2020, Suho released his debut EP, Self-Portrait and its lead single "Let's Love", becoming the fourth Exo member to have debuted as a solo artist. The EP debuted at number one on the Gaon Album Chart and has sold over 290,338 copies in South Korea. He won all three main music shows in Korean broadcast during the week and became the first Exo member to do so. On May 14, Suho enlisted for his mandatory military service as a public service officer. He was discharged on February 13, 2022.

On March 10, 2022, it was confirmed that Suho will release his second mini album Grey Suit and its lead single of the same name on April 4, 2022, which will be a comeback after his discharge from the military. On October 23, Thai actor-singer Mew Suppasit released his single, "Turn Off The Alarm", a collaboration with Suho.

Personal life
In 2009, Suho began attending Korea National University of Arts, however, he withdrew from it in 2011 and continued his education at Kyung Hee Cyber University along with fellow Exo members Chanyeol and Baekhyun. There he took classes for the Culture and Arts Department of Business Administration. In 2016, Suho started attending Inha University Graduate School for a master's degree in Culture Management.

Discography

Extended plays

Singles

Songwriting
All credits are adapted from the Korea Music Copyright Association, unless stated otherwise.

Filmography

Film

Television series

Web series

Television show

Music videos

Theater

Ambassadorship

Awards and nominations

Notes

References

External links

  
 
 
 
 

1991 births
Living people
Male actors from Seoul
Singers from Seoul
21st-century South Korean singers
Exo members
Japanese-language singers of South Korea
Mandarin-language singers of South Korea
South Korean contemporary R&B singers
South Korean dance music singers
South Korean electronic music singers
South Korean male singers
South Korean male television actors
South Korean male film actors
South Korean male web series actors
South Korean male idols
K-pop singers
South Korean mandopop singers
South Korean pop singers
South Korean singer-songwriters
SM Entertainment artists
South Korean male singer-songwriters
South Korean male musical theatre actors
Whimoon High School alumni